Velina Hasu Houston (born Velina Avisa Hasu Houston; May 5, 1957) is an  American playwright, essayist, poet, author, editor and screenwriter who has had many works produced, presented and published. Her work draws from her experience of being multiracial, as well as from the immigrant experiences of her family and those she encountered growing up in Junction City, Kansas.

Houston is best known for her play Tea, which portrays the lives of Japanese war brides who move to the United States with their American servicemen husbands.

Early life
The youngest of three, Houston was born in international waters on a military ship en route to a U.S. base in Japan. Her Japanese mother, Setsuko Takechi, was originally from Matsuyama, Ehime, a provincial town in Shikoku Island. Her father, Lemo Houston, was African Native American/Blackfoot-Pikuni Native American Indian originally from Linden, Alabama. Houston's ancestral lineages include historical ethnic ties to India, Cuba, Armenia, Greece and China, with family ties to Hawaii, England, Germany, Brazil, Argentina and Scotland.

Her parents met in Kobe in 1946, beginning their nine-year courtship at the disapproval of Velina's maternal grandfather who committed suicide as a result of his country's defeat in World War II and by the loss of his family's land due to the land reform policies supported by the US occupation. After the couple married, they eventually severed ties with both their families. The couple went on to adopt their only son Joji Kawada George Adam Houston, an Amerasian, in Tokyo after he was left orphaned at eight years old during the U.S. occupation.

In 1949, Velina's father returned to the United States. In order to be reunited with Setsuko, he volunteered for active duty in the Korean War and returned to Asia in 1951. Lemo and Setsuko's nine-year courtship was due to the fact that he respected her wishes to remain in Japan to care for her ailing mother. The couple married in 1954 and came to the U.S. in 1957 with Joji and Velina's sister Hilda Rika Hatsuyo. Velina was born en route and granted citizenship at her father's first U.S. military assignment at Fort Riley. Their new American experience was met with being discriminated against by Americans (including Japanese Americans) from both within and outside of their family, but the experience strengthened them and planted the seeds for the young writer.

The family settled in Junction City, Kansas, a small town adjacent to the military base, living a culturally Japanese lifestyle at the insistence of Velina's mother, Setsuko. In 1969, as a result of combat-related stress and alcoholism, Velina's father died. Setsuko continued raising her family in Junction City, a community consisting of mostly Japanese and European immigrant women who married Americans after World War II.

Education
Houston attended graduate school at the University of California at Los Angeles and at the University of Southern California. She holds a PhD from USC's School of Cinematic Arts, and an MFA from the University of California at Los Angeles' School of Theater, Film, and Television. She also attended Kansas State University, Manhattan, Kansas, majoring in journalism and theater with a minor in philosophy.

Awards

Houston has been recognized as a Japan Foundation Fellow, a Rockefeller Foundation Fellow (twice), a Sidney F. Brody Fellow, a James Zumberge Fellow (thrice), a California Arts Council fellow, and a Los Angeles Endowment for the Arts Fellow. She is a Pinter Review Prize for Drama Silver Medalist for Calling Aphrodite, which also was a finalist for the American Theatre Critics Association Steinberg New Play Award for its 2007 world premiere.

Present day
Houston continues to write plays and also works in other genres of writing.

Houston is the Professor, Associate Dean of Faculty, Resident Playwright, and Founder/Director of the undergraduate Playwriting Program and Master of Fine Arts in Dramatic Writing at the University of Southern California. For several years, she taught master classes in screenwriting at the University of California at Los Angeles School of Theater, Film, and Television.

Her most recent production was a premiere of her adaptation of Little Women, produced by the Playwrights' Arena in Los Angeles, on October and November, 2017.

Personal life
Houston resides in Los Angeles, with homes in Hawaii and Kyoto. She is married to Peter H. Jones of Manchester, England, with whom she has two children and two stepsons: Kiyoshi S. S. Houston, K. Leilani Houston, Evan W. Jones and Jason K. Jones. Raised as a Buddhist and Shintoist, Houston attends an Episcopal parish, but practices a polytheistic faith.

Works
 (ed.) The Politics of Life: Four Plays by Asian American Women. Philadelphia: Temple University Press, 1993. Anthology of plays by Wakako Yamauchi, Genny Lim and Velina Hasu Houston.
 (ed.) But still, like air, I'll rise: new Asian American plays. Philadelphia: Temple University Press, 1997. Anthology of plays by Jeannie Barroga, Philip Kan Gotanda, Velina Hasu Houston, Huynh Quang Nhuong, David Henry Hwang, Victoria Nalani Kneubuhl, Sung Rno, Dmae Roberts, Lucy Wang, Elizabeth Wong and Chay Yew.

References

1957 births
Living people
20th-century American women writers
American women poets
American dramatists and playwrights of Japanese descent
American writers of Japanese descent
American poets
American poets of Asian descent
American women writers of Asian descent
University of Southern California faculty
People from Junction City, Kansas
People from Tokyo
American women dramatists and playwrights
Writers from Kansas
Writers from California
20th-century American dramatists and playwrights
20th-century American poets
American women academics
African-American poets
20th-century African-American women writers
20th-century African-American writers
21st-century African-American people
21st-century African-American women